Rugby union in Indonesia is a minor but growing sport, dating back several decades, and which has experienced fluctuations in its success. There are currently just under six hundred registered players in the country.

Governing body
The governing body is the Indonesian Rugby Football Union which is a member of World Rugby, and Asian Rugby Football Union.

History
Rugby was first introduced into the Dutch East Indies, during the colonial period.

In 1983, it was recorded that there were four rugby clubs in the country, namely the International Sports Club (consisting of businessmen) based in Jakarta, another based in Kalimantan (mostly of French origin), another based at Bandung (with a 15 ft rise between the touchlines), and the fourth, bizarrely was based on a US Navy vessel, and its home games were played there. Many of Indonesia's rugby pitches still have unusual distinctions - one is in the heart of the Indonesian jungle, another on a mountain summit, and another in the middle of a tea plantation.

Supposedly the game died out in 1986, after Indonesia had participated in Hong Kong Sevens. However, with the help of a group of Australian, New Zealand and Welsh expats, along with local Indonesians, Malaysians and Singaporeans, the game was revived in 2004.

Although traditionally seen as the province of Commonwealth expatriates, the game has made strides amongst the native population.

As with many other minor rugby nations, the sport is mainly played in and around the capital Jakarta. It is often staged by various multisport clubs. Among the more prominent Jakarta-based clubs are the Jakarta Komodos Rugby Club and the Jakarta Banteng Rugby Club.

Today there is an Indonesia national rugby union team and a somewhat successful sevens team, and the game is somewhat more developed, but remains minor. There is also an ongoing schools programme.

References

External links
 IRB Indonesia page
 official union page
 Rugby in Asia, Indonesia page
 Asian Rugby Football Union
 "Islam and Rugby" on the Rugby Readers review
 Archives du Rugby: Indonesie